Dominic John Foreman (6 August 1933 – 17 July 2020) was an Australian politician. He was a union official and South Australian Secretary of the Vehicle Builders' Employees' Union before entering politics. From 1979-1980 he was President of the South Australian Labor Party. In 1980, he was elected to the Australian Senate as a Labor Senator for South Australia. He held the seat until his resignation in 1997; John Quirke was appointed to replace him.

References

1933 births
2020 deaths
Australian Labor Party members of the Parliament of Australia
Members of the Australian Senate for South Australia
Members of the Australian Senate
20th-century Australian politicians